Dendropicos is a genus of woodpeckers in the family Picidae. They are small woodpeckers that are native to the sub-Saharan woodlands and forests.

Taxonomy
The genus Dendropicos was introduced by the French ornithologist, Alfred Malherbe in 1849. The type species was subsequently designated as one of the subspecies of the cardinal woodpecker. The word Dendropicos comes from the Greek dendron meaning tree and pikos for woodpecker. Molecular genetic studies have shown that the genus Dendropicos is sister to the genus Chloropicus.

The genus Dendropicos formerly contained several additional species. A 2015 molecular phylogenetic study that analysed nuclear and mitochondrial DNA sequences from pied woodpeckers found that Dendropicos was polyphyletic. In the rearranged genera the bearded, fire-bellied and yellow breasted woodpeckers were moved to Chloropicus while the Arabian woodpecker was moved to Dendrocoptes. The taxonomic committee of the British Ornithologists' Union have recommended an alternative arrangement of species in which the genera Dendrocoptes and Leiopicus are combined into a larger Dendropicos.

Elliot's, African grey, eastern grey and olive woodpeckers are sometimes placed in a separate genus, Mesopicos.

The genus contains the following 12 species:

Description
Only males have red plumage in the crown, and some species have red plumage on the rump or belly in either sex.

References

 
Bird genera
 
Taxa named by Alfred Malherbe
Taxonomy articles created by Polbot